In enzymology, a (+)-borneol dehydrogenase is an enzyme that increases the rate of, or catalyzes, the chemical reaction

(+)-borneol + NAD  (+)-camphor + NADH + H

Thus, the two substrates of this enzyme are (+)-borneol and NAD, whereas its 3 products are (+)-camphor, NADH, and H.

This enzyme belongs to the family of oxidoreductases, specifically those acting on the CH-OH group of donor with NAD or NADP as acceptor. The systematic name of this enzyme class is (+)-borneol:NAD oxidoreductase. This enzyme is also called bicyclic monoterpenol dehydrogenase.

References

External links

EC 1.1.1
NADH-dependent enzymes
Enzymes of unknown structure